The Peugeot V10 engine is a series of naturally-aspirated, V10, racing engines; produced between 1990 and 2000. These engines were used to compete in the World Sportscar Championship, between 1990 and 1993, with Peugeot winning the 24 Hours of Le Mans two years in a row (1992 and 1993). In 1994, they decided to make the switch to Formula One, using the same 3.5 L V10 derived from their highly successful, Le Mans-winning 905 Group C sports prototype, that was easily adjusted to F1 regulations. Peugeot debuted as an engine supplier with the McLaren team and remained in F1 until the end of the 2000 season.

Peugeot 905 SA35-A1/SA35-A2 engine 
Technically advanced, the 905 used a light alloy and high revving SA35-A1 3499 cc naturally aspirated V10 engine that was similar to F1 engines of the time. The 905 was built at Vélizy-Villacoublay 

The more powerful SA35-A2 engine evolution, used in the 905B, made its race debut at the Nürburgring round of the 1991 series.

Specifications 

 Manufacturer 	 	Peugeot
 First race 	 	1990
 Category 	 	Group C1
 Engine 	 	80°  V10, 40 valves
 Output 	 	 at 12,500 rpm (905B produced approximately )
 Transmission         6-speed sequential manual, mid-engine, rear-wheel-drive

Formula One A4/A6 engine
Peugeot decided to switch to Formula One, using the same 3.5L V10 from the 905 that was easily adjusted to F1 regulations. In 1994, Peugeot debuted as an engine supplier with the McLaren team. The Peugeot A4 V10, used by the McLaren Formula One team in 1994, initially developed  at 14,250 rpm. It was later further developed into the A6, which produced even more power; developing  at 14,500 rpm. Peugeot remained in F1 until the end of the 2000 season, when, after little success, they decided to focus and concentrate their efforts on the World Rally Championship.

Applications

Formula 1 cars
McLaren MP4/9 (A4/A6)
Jordan 195 (A10)
Jordan 196 (A12)
Jordan 197 (A14)
Prost AP01 (A16)
Prost AP02 (A18)
Prost AP03 (A20)

Group C sports prototypes
Peugeot 905 (SA35-A1/SA35-A2)

References 

Peugeot engines
Formula One engines
Engines by model
Gasoline engines by model
V10 engines